Danila is a given name. It's a masculine name in Russian and other Slavic languages, as a variation on the name Daniel. It's a feminine name in Italian, as a feminine form of Daniel.

People with the name Danila

Italian name 
 Danila Comastri Montanari (1948), Italian writer

Slavic name 
 Danila Izotov (1991), Russian swimmer
 Danila Khotulyov (2002), Russian football player
 Danila Kozlovsky (1985), Russian actor and director
 Danila Prokhin (2001), Russian football player
 Danila Tkachenko (1989), Russian virtual artist

Russian masculine given names
Italian feminine given names